A list of films produced in Spain in 1954 (see 1954 in film).

1954

External links
 Spanish films of 1954 at the Internet Movie Database

1954
Spanish
Films